The forward market is the informal over-the-counter financial market by which contracts for future delivery are entered into. It is mainly used for trading in foreign currencies, where the contracts are used to hedge against foreign exchange risk. Commodities are also traded on forward markets. Examples include agricultural products such as rice, and energy futures, such as oil and natural gas. Transactions on a forward market are typically not standardized, and contracts are customised to the needs of the trading parties. In contrast, standardized forward contracts are called futures contracts and traded on a futures exchange.

See also
Forward exchange market

References

Financial markets